Elizabeth Leveson-Gower  may refer to:

Elizabeth Leveson-Gower, Duchess of Sutherland (1765–1839)
Elizabeth Georgiana Leveson-Gower (1824 – 1878), British noblewoman and abolitionist